The Fleur-de-lis is a stylized design often used in heraldry or as a political symbol.

Fleur de Lys or Fleur de Lis may also refer to:

Places
 The Fleur-de-Lis Trail in Nova Scotia
 Fleur-de-Lys, Malta, part of the city Birkirkara, Malta
 Fleur-de-lis, Caerphilly, a village near Blackwood, Wales
 Fleur De Lys RFC, a rugby union team
 Fleur de Lys, Newfoundland and Labrador, Canada
 Fleur de Lys (Los Angeles, California), a mansion
 Fleur de Lis Hotel, Canterbury, Kent, England

Fictional characters
 Fleur de Lys (superhero), a character from Quebec created by Mark Shainblum
 Fleur-de-Lis (DC Comics), a superhero character from France in the Global Guardians
 Fleur-de-Lys de Gondelaurier, a character in the novel The Hunchback of Notre Dame by Victor Hugo

Other
 The original stage name of the Filipino film actress Florida Yapco, better known as Mona Lisa
 The Fleur de Lys, a British band from the mid-1960s
 Fleur de Lis Stakes, a thoroughbred horse race at Churchill Downs, Kentucky
 Fleur de lis, a flight maneuver performed by the Blue Angels
 Fleur de Lys (restaurant), a fine-dining French cuisine restaurant in San Francisco, California and Las Vegas, Nevada.
 The Fascination of the Fleur de Lis, a 1915 silent film starring Lon Chaney, Sr.
 "Fleur De Lys", a song by Juliana Hatfield from the 1995 album Only Everything